The PU scope (ПУ, прицел укороченный, 'Scope short-cut' in comparison to PE/PEM telescopic sight) is a 3.5×21 telescopic sight of Soviet manufacture, widely used since 1940 on the SVT-40 rifle for which it was originally designed and since 1942 on the Mosin–Nagant rifle. Before converting the PU for Mosin–Nagant Model 1891/30 sniper rifles these rifles used 3.87×30 PE(M) telescopic sights, a Soviet-made copy of a German Zeiss design, while later rifles used smaller, simpler, and easier-to-produce 3.5×21 PU telescopic sights. The PU telescopic sight has a fixed at 3.5 power magnification. The bullet drop compensation (BDC) adjustment in the elevation turret is free spinning under grease friction. The windage adjustment turret of the telescopic sight features more conventional click adjustments in milliradian increments.
The design turned out to be so successful and in demand that production was not stopped after World War II and the sight was converted for and used on other small arms.

While it has been claimed that Soviet optical instrument makers attempted to create a 6× version of the telescopic sight, this has been refuted. An after-market objective lens, known as the PU Magnifier (PUM), is able to give the PU telescopic sight a 6.5× power.

Technical specifications
 Magnification: 3.5×
 Objective diameter: 21 mm
 Field of view: 4° 30′
 Exit pupil: 6 mm
 Eye relief: 72 mm
 Limiting optical resolution: 17 SOA
 Weight: 0.27 kg
 Length: 169 mm

Gallery

External links

 Brief overview

Firearm sights of the Soviet Union